TEA chloride may refer to:

 Tetraethylammonium chloride
 Triethylammonium chloride, the hydrochloride salt of triethylamine